Omiš (Latin and ) is a town and port in the Dalmatia region of Croatia, and is a municipality in the Split-Dalmatia County. Its location is where the Cetina River meets the Adriatic Sea.

Name
It is supposed that the name of this city, Omiš, developed from the Slavic Holm, Hum as a translation from the Illyrian - Greek word Onaion, Oneon, meaning "hill" or "place on the hill", or from Greek onos (όνος) meaning donkey, perhaps from the shape of the rocky promontory by the city (naming a city after a natural form was common practice then, as it is now); there is also the possibility that the name of the settlement Onaeum was derived from the name of the river which was called Nestos by the Greek colonists in its lower flow, during Antiquity. According to Petar Šimunović, Omiš is derived from Proto-Indo-European *almissa ("rock", "cliff").

Latin names during Ancient Rome were Onaeum, Oeneum, Alminium, and Almissum. During Medieval times the name was recorded as Olmissium, Almiyssium and from the end of the 15th century, when the city fell to the authority of Venetian Republic, its name was the Italian Almissa.

History

Omiš was well known in the past by the Corsairs of Almissa (Omiški gusari) whose Sagittas (ships) (Genitive case: Sagittae, translated as The Arrow), brought fame to them because they were built for attack and fast retrieval into the mouth of the Cetina River, protecting the town from foreign invaders. At a very early date, neighbours of the Corsairs of Almissa, the highlanders of the Poljica Principality (Poljička Republika), became their friends and allies. This allowed them to harass the seaborne trade, without fear of a sudden attack from inland.

Historical monuments:
 Church of St Euphemia by the coast on Brzet, from the early 6th century
 Mirabella Fortress (Peovica) from the 13th century
 Starigrad Fortress (Fortica) from the 15th century
 Renaissance church of the Holy Spirit from the 15th century
 Old cemetery, the 16th century or 17th century
 Parochial church from the 17th century
 Franciscan Monastery on Skalice from the 18th century

In the Priko neighborhood, on the right bank of the Cetina River, stands the site with the most historic significance: the pre-Romanesque Church of St. Peter (Crkva Sv. Petra) from the tenth century A.D. This single-naved edifice, with a cupola and apse, was used in the 18th century as a Glagolithic seminary for novice priests.

Economy
Today, Omiš's economy is based on farming, fishing, textile and food-processing industries and tourism.

Settlements
Within the limits of the town lie the following settlements:

 Blato na Cetini, population 465
 Borak, population 158
 Čelina, population 222
 Čisla, population 302
 Donji Dolac, population 373
 Dubrava, population 300
 Gata, population 567
 Gornji Dolac, population 119
 Kostanje, population 605
 Kučiće, population 607
 Lokva Rogoznica, population 397
 Marušići, population 151
 Mimice, population 216
 Naklice, population 236
 Nova Sela, population 224
 Omiš, population 6,462
 Ostrvica, population 196
 Pisak, population 202
 Podašpilje, population 20
 Podgrađe, population 280
 Putišići, population 46
 Seoca, population 140
 Slime, population 270
 Smolonje, population 79
 Srijane, population 270
 Stanići, population 534
 Svinišće, population 98
 Trnbusi, population 162
 Tugare, population 885
 Zakučac, population 148
 Zvečanje, population 202

Culture

Omiš is best known for the traditional festival of the Dalmatian a cappella singing groups. This festival is the highlight of Omiš's summer, the expression of the town's beauty. Omiš's Summer Festival - during which various concerts and recitals are performed - takes place at the plazas and in churches.

Omiš as a town has eight churches:
 church of Saint Michael
 church of Holy Ghost
 church of Saint Rock
 church of Saint Peter
 church of Saint Luca
 church of Saint Mary
 Franciscan Monastery with church of Our Lady of Carmel
 church of Saint Stephan and
 remains of church of Saint John in Borak.

International relations

Twin towns — Sister cities
Omiš is twinned with:

 Bol, Croatia
 Havířov, Czech Republic
 Nepomuk, Czech Republic
 Zagorje ob Savi, Slovenia
 San Felice del Molise, Italy
 Ryazan, Russian Federation
 Krupina, Slovakia
 Poprad, Slovakia

Image gallery

References

Bibliography

External links

Omiš tourist board official website
Unofficial Website of Omis, Croatia

 
Cities and towns in Croatia
Populated places in Split-Dalmatia County
Populated coastal places in Croatia
Seaside resorts in Croatia